The 2012–13 Hofstra Pride men's basketball team represented Hofstra University during the 2012–13 NCAA Division I men's basketball season. The Pride, led by third year head coach Mo Cassara, played their home games at Mack Sports Complex and were members of the Colonial Athletic Association. They finished the season 7–25, 4–14 in CAA play to finish in tenth place. They lost in the quarterfinals of the CAA tournament to Delaware.

Roster

Schedule

|-
!colspan=9| Exhibition

|-
!colspan=9| Regular season

|-
!colspan=9| 2013 CAA men's basketball tournament

References

Hofstra Pride men's basketball seasons
Hofstra